James Riddell may refer to:

 James Riddell (skier) (1909–2000), British skier and author
 James Riddell (politician) (1850–1926), Scottish-Canadian farmer and political figure in Manitoba
 James Riddell (scholar) (1823–1866), English classical scholar
 James Riddell (footballer) (1891–?), Scottish footballer
 Sir James Milles Riddell, 2nd Baronet (1787–1861), Scottish landowner and agricultural improver

See also
Jim Riddell, New Zealand rugby league player